Jeferson Douglas dos Santos Batista or simply Jeferson (born February 13, 1989 in Belo Horizonte), is a Brazilian attacking midfielder. He played in the 2008 Campeonato Mineiro for Democrata-GV on loan from Atlético Mineiro. Jeferson last played for Metalurg Zaphorizhya in Ukraine.

Contract
Atlético Mineiro 20 March 2007 to 15 March 2012

References

External links
http://www.fcmetalurg.com

1989 births
Living people
Brazilian footballers
Brazilian expatriate footballers
Clube Atlético Mineiro players
Clube de Regatas Brasil players
Sport Club Internacional players
FC Metalurh Zaporizhzhia players
Ukrainian Premier League players
Expatriate footballers in Ukraine
Brazilian expatriate sportspeople in Ukraine
Association football midfielders
Footballers from Belo Horizonte